Golmud South railway station is a freight-handling station in Golmud, Haixi Mongol and Tibetan Autonomous Prefecture, Qinghai, China. It is under the jurisdiction of China Railway Qingzang Group.

The station is located on a loop from the Qinghai–Tibet railway, bypassing Golmud railway station. There is also a connection to the Golmud–Korla railway.

History
Plans to construct a new railway station in Golmud, bypassing the existing Golmud station, were announced in 2012. The station was completed in April 2021.

References

Railway stations in Qinghai